Tutai Tura (born 3 October 1949) is a Cook Islands politician and former  member of the Cook Islands Parliament.  Since March 2021 he has been Speaker of the Cook Islands Parliament. He is a member of the Cook Islands Party.
 
Tura was born on Rarotonga, and educated at Avarua School and Tereora College.  He trained as an electrician and worked for the government on Mauke. He was first elected to Parliament at the 2010 election. Shortly after his election he called for wage increases to counteract the higher cost of living in Mauke. In 2015 he was appointed Associate Minister for Foreign Affairs and Immigration.

In April 2019 Tura was appointed Deputy Speaker. In June 2020 he attempted to ban a Cook Islands News journalist from Parliament over a story about MPs' allowances.

On 22 March 2021 Tura was elected Speaker, succeeding Niki Rattle.

He did not stand at the 2022 Cook Islands general election.

References

Living people
People from Rarotonga
Members of the Parliament of the Cook Islands
Speakers of the Cook Islands Parliament
Cook Islands Party politicians
1949 births
People from Mauke